Rhaphiodon is the scientific name of two genera of organisms and may refer to:

Rhaphiodon (fish), a genus of fish in the family Cynodontidae
Rhaphiodon (plant), a genus of plants in the family Lamiaceae